Graham Ward may refer to:

 Graham Ward (footballer) (born 1985), assistant manager of Wolverhampton Sporting
 Graham Ward (theologian) (born 1955), Regius Professor of Divinity at Oxford
 Graham Ward (musician), drummer, sound engineer and sound designer